Jamie's 30-Minute Meals is a series of 40 episodes aired in 2010 on Channel 4 in which Jamie Oliver cooks a three- to four-dish meal in under 30 minutes. The show premiered on 11 October 2010 and aired over eight weeks, ending on 3 December 2010.

On the day the final episode aired, a cookbook of the same name was released. It became the fastest-selling non-fiction work of all time, selling 735,000 copies in its first week on sale.

Episodes

References

Channel 4 original programming
2010 British television series debuts
2010 British television series endings
British cooking television shows
English-language television shows